In military terms, 115th Division or 115th Infantry Division may refer to:

 115th Division (People's Republic of China)
 115th Infantry Division (German Empire)
 115th Division (Imperial Japanese Army)
 115th Guards Motor Rifle Division (Soviet Union, post World War II)